Tunkhannock Area High School lies in the valley of the Endless Mountains. The school is located at 135 Tiger Street, Tunkhannock in Wyoming County, Pennsylvania, United States. It is the sole high school operated by the Tunkhannock Area School District. Enrollemnt was 921 for the 2020–21 school year.

Tunkhannock Area High School students may choose to attend Susquehanna County Career and Technology Center for training in the construction and mechanical trades, cosmetology, Food Management and other careers. The Luzerne Intermediate Unit IU18 provides the school with a wide variety of services like specialized education for disabled students and hearing, speech and visual disability services and professional development for staff and faculty.

Music program 
The music program at Tunkhannock High School allows students to develop into the study and performance of music through instruments and singing. The Drama and Music Department works together to perform their annual fall plays and spring musicals. The music program is highly respected, and one of the best in surrounding counties.

Courses offered:
Marching/Concert Band
Music Theory and Composition
Jazz Ensemble 1
Jazz Ensemble 2
String Ensemble
Mixed Chorus
Advance Vocal Class
Women's Chorus
Piano Class

School to career opportunities 
This program is available to all students that would like to experience the work force while still in high school. Students may also work in or job shadow several a variety of careers to help them decide their future plans. Some of the opportunities that students may take part in are Cooperative Vocational Education, Internship Program, Job Shadowing Summer Tech Prep Co-op Program, Skills VSA/VICA, and Transitional Job Shadowing/Job Training.

Extracurriculars
Tunkhannock Area School District offers a variety of clubs, activities and an extensive sports program in association with the Pennsylvania Interscholastic Athletic Association (PIAA).

Athletics
The school provides:
Varsity

Boys
Baseball - AAA
Basketball- AAA
Cross country - AA
Football - AAA
Golf - AAA
Lacrosse - AAAA
Soccer - AA
Swimming and diving - AA
Tennis - AA
Track and field - AAA
Volleyball - AA
Water Polo - AA
Wrestling - AAA

Girls
Basketball - AAA
Cheerleading - AAAA
Cross country - AA
Field hockey - AA
Golf - AAA
Lacrosse - AAAA
Soccer - AA
Softball - AAA
Swimming and diving - AA
Tennis - AA
Track and field - AAA
Volleyball - AA

According to PIAA directory 2014–15, July 2014

In the fall of 2009, the Tunkhannock Area boys' cross country team won the district II PIAA Championship and then went on to compete in state meet in Hershey, Pennsylvania. In June 2010, the Tunkhannock Area baseball team were crowned District II AAA Champions. The team advanced to the quarterfinals of the state playoff before being defeated by Conrad-Weiser. In June 2011, the Tunkhannock Area baseball team advanced to the AAA State Championship for the first time in school history. In May 2013, the Tunkhannock Area boys' track and field team won the District II PIAA Championship for the first time in school history.

Notable alumni

References

External links

Tunkhannock Area School District Web Page
Tunkhannock Home Page
"Students Sue Prosecutor in Cellphone Photos Case" article by Sean D. Hamill in The New York Times March 25, 2009

Schools in Wyoming County, Pennsylvania
Public high schools in Pennsylvania